Lambers is a surname. Notable people with the surname include:

Jeroen Lambers (born 1980), Dutch footballer
Ineke Lambers-Hacquebard (1946–2014), Dutch politician
Paul Ronald Lambers (1942–1970), American army soldier and Medal of Honor recipient

See also
Lambert (name)

Surnames of Dutch origin